Spiridonov (masculine) or Spiridonova (feminine) is a Slavic surname. Notable people with the surname include:

Aleksey Spiridonov (1951–1998), Soviet Russian hammer thrower
Aleksey Spiridonov (born 1988), Russian volleyball player
Alexander Spiridonov (born 1989), Russian politician
Andrei Spiridonov (born 1982), Kazakhstani ice hockey player
Emil Spiridonov (1925–1981), Soviet naval officer
Ilia Spiridonov (born 1998), Russian pairs figure skater
Julia Spiridonova – Yulka (born 1972), Bulgarian novelist and screenwriter
Leonid Spiridonov (born 1980), Kazakhstani sport wrestler
Maria Spiridonova (1884–1941), Russian revolutionary and assassin
Maxim Spiridonov (born 1978), Russian ice hockey player
Nikola Spiridonov (1938–2021), Bulgarian chess master
Vadim Spiridonov (1944–1989), Russian film actor